The 1960 Dutch Grand Prix was a Formula One motor race held at Zandvoort on 6 June 1960. It was race 4 of 10 in the 1960 World Championship of Drivers and race 3 of 9 in the 1960 International Cup for Formula One Manufacturers.

Due to a crash by Dan Gurney, a spectator, who was in a prohibited area, was killed during this event.

This race marked the Formula One debut of future World Champion Jim Clark.

Classification

Qualifying

Race

Championship standings after the race

Drivers' Championship standings

Constructors' Championship standings

 Notes: Only the top five positions are included for both sets of standings.

References

Dutch Grand Prix
Dutch Grand Prix
Grand Prix
Dutch Grand Prix